Renoir is a 2012 French drama film based on the last years of Pierre-Auguste Renoir at Cagnes-sur-Mer during World War I. The film was directed by Gilles Bourdos and competed in the Un Certain Regard section at the 2012 Cannes Film Festival. The film is set in the south of France during World War I and stars Michel Bouquet, Christa Theret, Thomas Doret and Vincent Rottiers.

Renoir achieved critical and commercial success both in France and abroad, most notably in the United States where it is on the Critic's Pick list of The New York Times. The film was selected as the French entry for the Best Foreign Language Film at the 86th Academy Awards, but was not nominated. In January 2014, the film received four nominations at the 39th César Awards, winning for Best Costume Design.

Plot
The film tells the forgotten story of Andrée Heuschling, also known as Catherine Hessling, who was the last model of impressionist painter Pierre-Auguste Renoir and the first actress in the films of his son, the film director Jean Renoir.  Andrée was the link between two famous and widely acclaimed artists, a father and son.  While the father is at the end of his brilliant career, the son is still searching for himself, his great career as one of the most celebrated movie directors having not yet begun.

Director Gilles Bourdos used the services of a convicted art forger, Guy Ribes, to create and re-create the Renoir paintings in live action on screen.

Cast
 Michel Bouquet as Auguste Renoir
 Christa Théret as Andrée Heuschling
 Vincent Rottiers as Jean Renoir
 Thomas Doret as Coco
 Romane Bohringer as Gabrielle Renard
 Michèle Gleizer as Mme Renoir (Aline Charigot)
 Carlo Brandt as Le docteur Pratt
 Hélène Babu as Odette
 Marion Lécrivain as Véra Sergine
 Hervé Briaux as Ambroise Vollard
 Stuart Seide as le docteur Barnes
 Emmanuelle Lepoutre as la Médecine
 Thierry Hancisse as le brocanteur
 Annelise Heimburger as  la Boulangère
 Sylviane Goudal as la Grande Louise
 Solène Rigot as Madeleine

Reception
The film received generally favorable reviews from critics. The review aggregator Rotten Tomatoes reported 72% of critics gave the film a positive review based on 69 reviews, with an average score of 6.5/10. The critical consensus is: "Appropriately enough, Renoir offers viewers a drama of sumptuous beauty—which is more than enough to offset its frustratingly slow pace and rather thinly written screenplay." Metacritic, which assigns a standardized score out of 100, rated the film 64 based on 23 reviews, indicating "generally favorable reviews".

Accolades

See also
 List of submissions to the 86th Academy Awards for Best Foreign Language Film
 List of French submissions for the Academy Award for Best Foreign Language Film

References

External links
  (in French)
 

2012 films
2012 drama films
2010s historical drama films
2012 biographical drama films
2010s French-language films
French historical drama films
French biographical drama films
Biographical films about painters
Cultural depictions of Pierre-Auguste Renoir
Films set on the French home front during World War I
Films shot in France
Films directed by Gilles Bourdos
Films scored by Alexandre Desplat
2010s French films